Roman Benecký (born 20 January 2000) is a Czech professional darts player who currently plays in Professional Darts Corporation (PDC) events. He represented his country at the 2018 PDC World Cup of Darts and qualify for the 2022 PDC World Darts Championship.

Career
Benecký started playing darts in 2009, at the age of 9. He first played in soft-tip darts tournaments for a few years and in 2017 he became the EDU European Champion at the U18 category. In the final match he defeated Oguzhan Kaya and took a gold medal. In 2016, he achieved other of his greatest youth's successes by winning the Czech Open Youth's tournament.

In 2018, he quite surprisingly won the qualification for the 2018 PDC World Cup of Darts where he played for the Czech Republic with Karel Sedláček. In the first round doubles match they faced Rob Cross and Dave Chisnall, who defeated them by 3–5 in legs. In 2019, he took part in PDC Development Tour tournaments for the first time. In addition to two rounds of 16, a quarter-final was the best result of the year, which also gave him qualification for the 2019 PDC World Youth Championship. In the decisive group game he was defeated by Nathan Rafferty and thus missed the knock-out rounds.

In 2020, he played in PDC Development Tour and went to the semi-finals later in the year, which guaranteed him a start in the 2020 PDC World Youth Championship. He was eliminated once again in the group stage, by eventual finalist Joe Davis. At the end of 2021, in the final of the Eastern Europe Qualifier tournament he prevailed against Karel Sedláček and therefore qualified for the 2022 PDC World Darts Championship. There he faced Ryan Joyce in the first round match, whom he narrowly lost in the decider. At the Q-School, Benecký was once again unable to earn a tour card, and a little later he made it into the quarter-finals at the PDC Challenge Tour. At the end of March, Benecky advanced to his first two Players Championship.

World Championship results

PDC
 2022: First round (lost to Ryan Joyce 2–3) (sets)

Performance timeline

References

2000 births
Living people
Czech darts players
PDC World Cup of Darts Czech team